Gilbert Guillaume (born 4 December 1930) is a French jurist and judge who served as President of the International Court of Justice (ICJ) from 2000 to 2003. He was a Judge of the ICJ between 1987 and 2005 and also previously served as a member of the Permanent Court of Arbitration (PCA) from 1980.

A native of Bois-Colombes, Seine, Guillaume studied at Sciences Po and graduated from the École nationale d'administration in 1957. He was appointed a master of requests at the Conseil d'État before joining the Ministry of Foreign Affairs as Director of Juridicial Affairs in 1979. In 2007 he became a member of the Académie des Sciences Morales et Politiques, which he presided over in 2016, when he was awarded the Great Cross of the Legion of Honour. Guillaume is also a former member of the academic staff of Sciences Po, Paris.

Gilbert Guillaume is the father of Marc Guillaume (born 1964), who was appointed Prefect of Paris in 2020.

References

1930 births
Living people
20th-century French judges
21st-century French judges
Members of the Permanent Court of Arbitration
International Court of Justice judges
Presidents of the International Court of Justice
People from Bois-Colombes
Members of the French Academy of Sciences
Academic staff of Sciences Po
University of Paris alumni
Sciences Po alumni
École nationale d'administration alumni
20th-century French civil servants
Grand Croix of the Légion d'honneur
Knights of the Ordre national du Mérite
Commandeurs of the Ordre des Arts et des Lettres
Knights of the Order of Agricultural Merit
Knights of the Ordre du Mérite Maritime
Members of the Conseil d'État (France)